Vireši Parish is an administrative unit of Smiltene Municipality, Latvia.

Towns, villages and settlements of Vireši parish 
 Vireši
 Vidaga

Parishes of Latvia
Smiltene Municipality